Silvia Andreea Zarzu (born 16 December 1998) is a retired Romanian artistic gymnast. She was part of the Romanian team that won the gold medal in the team event at the 2014 European Championships and placed fourth at the 2014 World Championships.

Junior career 
Zarzu competed with Andreea Munteanu, Miriam Aribășoiu, Ștefania Stănilă, and Paula Tudorache at the 2012 European Junior Championships, and they won the bronze medal. Individually, Zarzu won the silver medal on the floor exercise behind Maria Kharenkova from Russia. She competed with Andreea Iridon and Laura Jurca at the 2013 European Youth Summer Olympic Festival, and they won the team bronze medal behind Russia and Great Britain. Zarzu won the bronze medal on the floor exercise behind Kharenkova and Kim Janas.

Senior career

2014 
Zarzu competed in a friendly meet between Belgium, France, and Romania and helped the Romanian team win the gold medal. She competed at the 2014 European Championships alongside Larisa Iordache, Diana Bulimar, Andreea Munteanu, and Ștefania Stănilă, and they won the team gold medal. In August, at the National Championships, Zarzu placed 13th in the all-around, 6th on vault, and 4th on floor. She competed at the 2014 World Championships with Larisa Iordache, Ștefania Stănilă, Andreea Munteanu, Anamaria Ocolișan, and Paula Tudorache, and they placed 4th in the team final.

2015 
In May, Zarzu competed at Four Nations Trophy and helped the Romanian team place 3rd after Russia and Italy. She represented Romania at the 2015 European Games with Andreea Iridon and Laura Jurca, and they placed 7th in the team competition. Individually, Zarzu finished 5th in the floor exercise event final. In September, she competed at a friendly meet between Romania and France and helped the team win the gold medal. She won the silver medal on the floor exercise at the National Championships behind Larisa Irodache, and she finished 4th in the all-around.

Zarzu was selected to compete at the 2015 World Championships along with Diana Bulimar, Ana Maria Ocolişan, Laura Jurca, Larisa Iordache, and Catalina Ponor. However, Ponor withdrew after having surgery, and alternate Andreea Iridon was put in. On the day before the qualification round, Ocolisan injured her ankle and could not compete. The Romanian team finished in thirteenth place, meaning that they did not directly qualify for the 2016 Olympics and had to compete at the Test Event.

2016 
Zarzu competed at the 2016 Olympic Test Event with Diana Bulimar, Maria Holbură, Anamaria Ocolișan, Cătălina Ponor, and Dora Vulcan, but the team finished 7th, meaning they did not qualify for the 2016 Olympic Games. She then competed with Anda Butuc, Ocolișan, Ponor, and Holbură at the 2016 European Championships where they finished 6th in the team final. In July, she placed seventh on uneven bars at the National Championships.

Competitive history

References

External links 
 
 

1998 births
Living people
People from Onești
Romanian female artistic gymnasts
Gymnasts at the 2015 European Games
European Games competitors for Romania
European champions in gymnastics
21st-century Romanian women